Area code 810 is one of the area codes in Michigan  area code in the North American Numbering Plan (NANP) for East Central Michigan. The numbering plan area (NPA) comprises the cities of Flint, Lapeer, Port Huron, and the southern portion of the Thumb.

History 
Area code 810 was split off from area code 313 on December 1, 1993, with a permissive dialing period that ended on August 10, 1994. The initial numbering plan area included the counties of Oakland, Macomb, Genesee, Lapeer, St. Clair, and Sanilac as well as small sections of Saginaw, Shiawassee, Livingston, Washtenaw, and Wayne counties north of Detroit. Most of Washtenaw County, all of Monroe County, and the southern and western portions of Wayne County (including the City of Detroit) remained in the 313 area code. The split created Michigan's first new area code since 1961.

By 1994, demand for telephone numbers increased such that there were plans for a new area code. Ameritech once again applied to the North American Numbering Plan Administrator for additional relief. As a result, Oakland County received the new area code 248, with a start of permissive dialing on May 10, 1997. Thus, the Oakland County numbering plan area was surrounded on three sides by area code 810, with 313 to the south.

Then, only four years after splitting off area code 248, continued demand in the area necessitated the Michigan Public Service Commission to request another relief code, creating yet another numbering plan area in southeastern Michigan. Area code 586 was assigned to the eleven rate centers that comprise Macomb County, including Mt. Clemens, Roseville, Warren and Utica. The commission permitted the permanent grandfathering of wireless central office codes residing in rate centers that moved to the new NPA.

Prior to October 2021, area code 810 had telephone numbers assigned for the central office code 988. In 2020, 988 was designated nationwide as a dialing code for the National Suicide Prevention Lifeline, which created a conflict for exchanges that permit seven-digit dialing. This area code was therefore scheduled to transition to ten-digit dialing by October 24, 2021.

Prior TWX assignment
Area code 810 was originally one of three US regional area codes for the AT&T TWX (TeletypeWriter eXchange) network, sold to Western Union in 1969, and renamed as Telex II. The area of TWX service included Michigan, Ohio, Indiana and the US South (North Carolina, South Carolina, Georgia, Florida, Louisiana, Mississippi, Alabama, and Kentucky).

The original TWX area codes were 510 in the US and 610 in Canada. The addition of 710 in the Northeast (New England, New York, New Jersey, Pennsylvania, Maryland, Washington DC, Virginia and West Virginia), 810 from Michigan southward and 910 west of the Mississippi allowed each major city one or more local exchange prefixes in the special area code.

The special US TWX area codes (510, 710, 810, 910) were decommissioned in 1981; Canada moved its remaining 1-610 numbers to area code 600 in 1992.

Service area
The numbering plan area includes all of Genesee and Lapeer counties and portions of Oakland, Macomb, St. Clair, Sanilac and Livingston counties. This area included the following communities.

Almont
Brighton
Burton
Clio
Columbiaville
Croswell
Davison
Fenton
Flint
Flushing
Goodrich
Grand Blanc
Hamburg
Imlay City
Lakeland
Lapeer
Lexington
Linden
Marine City
Marysville
Metamora
Mount Morris
Port Huron
Sandusky
St. Clair
Swartz Creek
Yale

Selected areas in north Oakland County areas of Oxford, Addison Township, Brandon Township, Groveland Township, and Holly are also partially served by 810.

In popular culture 
Jimmy "B-Rabbit" Smith (Eminem) refers to area code 810 while free-styling as he fixes his car in the movie 8 Mile to insult "posers" who live in upperclass southern Macomb County suburbs (which were part of the area code in 1995 when the movie was set) instead of the lower income area code 313, which serves Detroit and Wayne County.

The number "810", which is the area code for Flint, Michigan, the band's hometown, was used in the band name King 810 after they left Equal Vision.

See also

 List of exchanges from AreaCodeDownload.com, 810 Area Code

References

810
810